Dzūkija or Dainava is one of five ethnographic regions of Lithuania. Dzūkija is a cultural region defined by traditional lifestyles and dialects of the local Lithuanian population (mostly rural farmers) and has never been defined as a political or administrative unit. Traditionally, Alytus is regarded as the capital of the region, although it is not the largest city in Dzūkija, this title corresponding to the Lithuanian capital, Vilnius. The region has a significant Polish minority of 180 thousand  people or around 20% of the region's total population.

Geography

Dzūkija is situated in southeastern Lithuania, and consists of Alytus County and southern Vilnius County. Historically, it extended into what is now northeastern Poland (Podlaskie Voivodeship) and northwestern Belarus (Grodno Region).

Large parts of Dzūkija have light sandy soil, unsuited for agriculture. Therefore, the region is densely covered with pine forests, one of which is Dainava Forest, the largest in Lithuania. The Čepkeliai Marsh, the largest swamp in Lithuania, is situated in the region, near the border with Belarus. Dzūkija is also the most sparsely populated region in Lithuania, with average population density dropping below 15 people per square kilometer in Varėna district municipality. Due to lower harvests in infertile soil, the region was relatively poorer than the rest of Lithuania. Farmers had to supplement their yields with edible mushrooms and berries collected in the forests. Mushroom hunting remains an important part of the local economy.

Two of the five national parks in Lithuania are to be found in Dzūkija: Dzūkija National Park east of Varėna (established there in 1991), and Trakai National Historic Park near Trakai (1992).

The largest settlements (by population) are:
 Vilnius – 625,349
 Alytus – 53,514
 Druskininkai – 12,055
 Elektrėnai – 11,009
 Varėna – 8,021
 Šalčininkai – 6,857
 Nemenčinė – 4,831
 Pabradė – 4,837
 Trakai – 4,141
 Skaidiškės – 4,051

Language

People in Dzūkija traditionally speak the Dzūkian dialect (also known as South Aukštaitian), which is a sub-dialect of the Aukštaitian dialect. As elsewhere in Lithuania, local dialects such as these are dying out as people adopt the standard Lithuanian through schools and mass media.

The very first Lithuanian handwritten texts from the early 16th century show traits of the Dzūkian dialect.

The north-eastern half speaks Polish and spoke Belarusian for several centuries.

Coat of arms

The coat of arms of Dzūkija pictures a white armored warrior with a pollaxe in a blue shield. The blue color symbolizes loyalty and strength. The grand coat of arms is supported by two lynxes and has a Latin motto Ex gente bellicosissima populus laboriosus (Out of most warring tribe – industrious people). These symbols were created by heraldic artist Arvydas Každailis in 2003 using the historical symbols of Trakai. Dzūkija was part of the Duchy of Trakai and later Trakai Voivodeship from the 14th to late 18th century. The same image was used for the coat of arms of Alytus County, officially adopted in 2004. The coat of arms is a modified version of the coat of arms of Trakai district, which depicts a knight with a spear in a red shield. This symbol was taken from a seal used by Duke of Trakai Kęstutis (died in 1382). The motto honors the memory of the Yotvingians, one of the ancient Baltic tribes which were considered fine warriors that lived in what is now Dzūkija.

References

Lithuanian ethnographic regions